Wenyonella is a genus of parasitic alveolates in the phylum Apicomplexa. The genus was described in 1933 by Hoare.

The type species is Wenyonella africana.

Description

The species in this genus have oocysts with four sporocysts: each sporocyst gives rise to four sporozoites. They are found in the gastrointestinal tracts of reptiles, birds and mammals.

References 

Apicomplexa genera